Antiphanes may refer to:

Antiphanes (comic poet) of Athens 4th century BC (408–334 BC)

Antiphanes of Berge Athenian writer 4th century BC
Antiphanes of Argos sculptor

Antiphanes sculptor of Erechtheum
Antiphanes of Delos physician
Antiphanes of Macedon, epigrammatic poet 
Antiphanes of Megalopolis, epigrammatic poet 
Antiphanes (grasshopper), a genus of grasshoppers in the tribe Ommatolampidini